is a theme park located in Osaka, Japan. Opened on March 31, 2001, it is one of six Universal Studios theme parks worldwide and was the first to open outside the United States. The park is owned and operated by  a wholly owned subsidiary of NBCUniversal. The park is similar in layout to Universal Studios Florida and contains selected attractions from both Universal Orlando Resort and Universal Studios Hollywood, in addition to a small number of unique attractions.

Over 11 million guests visited the park in its opening year, making it the fastest theme park to reach the 10 million guest milestone at the time. As of 2019, USJ is the fifth-most visited theme park in the world and the third-most visited in Japan behind Tokyo Disneyland and Tokyo DisneySea.

History
In December 1992, Osaka Universal Planning Inc. was established in Minato-ku, Osaka to plan and research for the development and construction of a large-scale theme park in Japan. In February 1996, the master agreement regarding planning, construction and operation of the Universal Studios Japan theme park was concluded with American corporation MCA Inc. Osaka Universal Planning Inc. was also renamed USJ Co., Ltd. Licensing agreements regarding the planning, construction and operation of Universal Studios Japan was concluded with the Universal Group in 1998 and later that year, construction of the theme park officially began. The park opened on March 31, 2001.

Lands and attractions 

The attractions are spread across eleven different areas. The tenth area, The Wizarding World of Harry Potter, opened on 15 July 2014 with its flagship attraction, Harry Potter and the Forbidden Journey. The area and its attactions were modeled after its previous iterations at Universal Orlando and Universal Studios Hollywood. Its eleventh area, Super Nintendo World, opened after several delays on 18 March 2021.

Hollywood 
Based on the neighborhood of Hollywood, Los Angeles.

New York City 
Based on the city of New York City, New York.

San Francisco 
Based on the city of San Francisco, California.

Minion Park 
An area inspired by the Despicable Me franchise. It opened in March 2017.

Jurassic Park 
Inspired by Steven Spielberg's blockbuster film franchise of the same name.

Amity Village 
Inspired by Steven Spielberg's Jaws film.

Universal Wonderland 
Universal Wonderland is a section aimed at children and families. Opened in March 2012, it contains three themed sub-zones including Snoopy Studios, Hello Kitty's Fashion Avenue, and Sesame Street Fun Zone.

Snoopy Studios 
Based on the Peanuts comic strip. Snoopy Studios was originally its own standalone area, opening with the park in March 2001 before becoming part of Universal Wonderland in 2012.

Hello Kitty's Fashion Avenue 
Themed to Sanrio's Hello Kitty franchise.

Sesame Street Fun Zone 
Based on the children's television series Sesame Street. It is split into three areas - "Sesame Street Plaza", "Sesame Central Park" and "Elmo's Imagination Playland".

WaterWorld 
Based on Universal Pictures' 1995 film of the same name.

The Wizarding World of Harry Potter 

Based on Warner Bros Discovery's Wizarding World franchise.

Super Nintendo World 

Based on several Nintendo franchises, focusing on Super Mario and its Yoshi spin-off series. An expansion themed to the Donkey Kong Country spin-off series is under construction.

Seasonal Overlays 
The park is consistently installing seasonal attraction and show overlays. Some include Halloween Horror Nights, Christmas, Easter, Summer, and Cool Japan. The park's "Cool Japan" seasonal attractions have been based on popular anime and video game franchises, including: Sailor Moon, Attack on Titan, One Piece, Monster Hunter, and Final Fantasy.

Former attractions

Western 
The Western Area, and with it, The Wild Wild Wild West Stunt Show and the Animal Actors Stage show, were revamped to become Land of Oz in 2006. This involved completely re-theming two live shows, one restaurant and a number of retail facilities.

Land of Oz 
The Western Area was replaced for 2006 with an area based on L. Frank Baum's Wizard of Oz book series.

The land closed in February 2011 to make way for Universal Wonderland.

Parades 

The park has held a variety of seasonal parades throughout the past two decades, including: Festa de Parade, Universal Summer Parade- We Are One, and Minion Hacha-Mecha Christmas Party Parade.

Universal Studios Japan currently offers the nighttime Universal Spectacle Night Parade. This parade premiered on 17  May 2018, and features floats, performers, and characters based on the Harry Potter, Transformers, Jurassic World, and Minions franchises.

The park also offers a daily daytime parade, titled No limit! Parade. The parade held its first preview performance on 27 February 2023, and officially premiered on 1 March 2023. It features floats, characters, and performers based on Mario Kart, Pokemon, Minions, Sing, Hello Kitty, Sesame Street, and Peanuts. While Mario and Pikachu appeared on Universal's No Limit!-marketing float at the Midosuji Autum Party in November 2022, the No limit! Parade is the first time these franchises have appeared within a Universal Studios parade.

Awards 
In 2011, USJ's Christmas tree was recognized by the Guinness World Records as the most illuminated Christmas tree in the world having 260,498 lights.
 The Amazing Adventures of Spider-Man - The Ride
 2001 Screamscape Ultimate No.1 Favorite Overall Non-Coaster Thrill Ride
 2002 Theme Park Insider World Best Theme Park Attraction
 Animation Celebration
 2002 THEA Award (presented by TEA)   WINNER in Attraction
 Peter Pan's Neverland
 2007 THEA Award (presented by TEA)   WINNER in Event Spectacular
 The Gift of Angels
 2009 Big E Award, Best Overall Production, (presented by IIAPA) WINNER in the category "Best Overall Production, More Than $2 Million"
 Hollywood Dreams Parade
 2009 Big E Award (presented by IIAPA): Honorable Mention in the category "Best Overall Production, More Than $2 Million"
 Space Fantasy – The Ride
 2011 THEA Award (presented by TEA) winner in Outstanding Achievement

Attendance

Official hotels 

There are five official hotels at or near the park:
 Hotel Keihan Universal City
 Hotel Kintetsu Universal City
 Hotel Keihan Universal Tower
 Hotel Universal Port
 Park Front Hotel at Universal Studios Japan

Incidents 
In November 2004, a 35-year-old woman from Osaka Prefecture suffered nerve damage in her right wrist, affecting the use of two of her fingers. This occurred when her hand got stuck in a safety bar of the E.T. Adventure attraction as an employee pulled it down to secure it.

In October 2022, an employee at the amusement park found human bones in shrubbery along a road west of the premises.

See also 
 Incidents at Universal parks
 Tourism in Japan

References

External links 

 

 
Amusement parks in Japan
Buildings and structures in Osaka
2001 establishments in Japan
Entertainment companies established in 2001
Tourist attractions in Osaka
Amusement parks opened in 2001